Boy Crazy may refer to:

 Boy Crazy (game), a collectible card game for girls
 "Boy Crazy" (The Simple Life episode), a 2004 television episode
 Boy Crazy (film), a 1922 American comedy film
 "Boy Crazy", a 2010 single by Jasmine Sagginario
 "Boy Crazy", a 2000 song by New Found Glory from New Found Glory
 "Boy Crazy", a 1975 song by The Tubes from The Tubes

See also
 Crazy Boy (born 1978), Mexican professional wrestler
 Boyz Crazy, 2013 episode of Gravity Falls